The 4th season of the television series Arthur was originally broadcast on PBS in the United States from October 4 to 15, 1999 and contains 10 episodes. This is the last season with Luke Reid voicing Brain. Oliver Grainger has replaced Michael Caloz as D.W. due to Caloz's voice changing after the previous season.

Production
According to a April 7, 1999 CINAR press release, the episode "My Music Rules" was originally going to be the season premiere, but ended up being part of the season finale instead for undisclosed reasons.

Episodes

References

General references 
 
 
 
 

1999 American television seasons
Arthur (TV series) seasons
1999 Canadian television seasons